Aleutsky District is an administrative and municipal district (raion) of Kamchatka Krai, Russia, one of the eleven in the krai. It is located to the east of the Kamchatka Peninsula on the Commander Islands. The islands consist of Bering Island, Medny Island and fifteen much smaller ones, the largest of which are Tufted Puffin Rock, 15 hectares, and Kamen Ariy, which are between 3 km and 13 km west of the only settlement, Nikolskoye. Its administrative center is the rural locality (a selo) of Nikolskoye. Population:  All of the district's population resides in Nikolskoye.
 Russians – 51.4%
 Aleuts – 38.4%
 Ukrainians – 4.3%
 others – 6%

References

Notes

Sources

Commander Islands
Districts of Kamchatka Krai
Bering Sea